Bartolomeu Velho (died 1568) was a sixteenth-century Portuguese cartographer and cosmographer. 

Velho prepared the Carta General do Orbe (General Chart of the Globe) in 1561 for Sebastian of Portugal. 

He moved to France where he worked on his treatise Cosmographia which was published in Paris in 1568, the year of his death.

References

Portuguese cartographers
16th-century births
1568 deaths
16th-century Portuguese people
16th-century cartographers